Narsimha is a 1991 Indian Hindi-language action drama film. It stars Sunny Deol, Dimple Kapadia, Ravi Behl, Urmila Matondkar and Om Puri. The film was directed by N. Chandra and was a commercial success. The movie was the debut movie for actor Ravi Behl and actress Urmila Matondkar, though she appeared in movies like Bade Ghar Ki Beti in small roles. Incidentally, both of them had appeared in many movies as child artists.

Plot
Narsimha, a young and capable man, lives a middle-class life with his family in a quiet neighborhood. He gets his beautiful sister married to an eligible young man in their vicinity. On the occasion of his sister giving birth, he returns home to find a communal conflict arise in his neighbourhood, which spreads to the whole city. He seeks refuge in a dwelling area nearby only to return and find out his whole family has been murdered. With no aim left in life, Narsimha decides to turn to crime and alcohol. He later decides to work for a man called Suraj Narayan Singh, aka Bapji a big cruel landlord and capitalist, who controls the crime, law and order of the city and rules over it using muscle power and his immense wealth. Bapji was delighted to get hold of a man like Narsimha, who has wits and also muscle power, but has lost the desire to live and hence Narsimha executes his most difficult works which others can't accomplish. Bapji believes that he has become invincible and nobody can dare protest him since he has the city under his complete subjugation. He considers Narsimha as a weapon which can unlock his most difficult problems and Narsimha accomplishes them without asking any questions. Narsimha remains drunk all day and only comes when summoned by Bapji to execute Bapji's assignments and receive his payments.

However, all humanity is not lost in Narsimha and he occasionally helps out people in distress. But he remains drunk most of the time and leads life solely on the money provided by Bapji. Bapji openly declared to the city that since he is so powerful, influential and rich, hence nobody can kill him, not man or animal, neither by weapons nor any device, not in day neither in night, just like the Hindu historical Demon King Hiranyakshapu, who had obtained the same boon from Lord Brahma after a long penance. Hence Bapji asks the people of the city to consider him as their Lord since he completely controls the money and the good force of the city and practically rules the city as per his own wish. When Bapji discovers that his daughter Meenu has fallen in love with her college mate Ravi, he asks Narsimha to destroy Ravi's family and kill Ravi. Witnessing the revolutionary honest character of Ravi's sister Anitah, humanity rekindles again in Narsimha and he vows to protect Anita's family. Gradually, Narsimha and Anita fall in love with each other. Narsimha then joins forces with Anita and Ravi to force Bapji to get Meenu married to Ravi. Narsimha openly conflicts with Bapji as he is the only one smart and strong enough to take on Bapji and is aided by his few loyal friends and Anita. The conflict escalates to a very large extent and Anita, with Narsimha's help, was successful in rousing local help and mob support against Bapji's Oppressive and illegal rule. Bapji tries all the tricks in the book to curb this rising opposition using his goons, muscle men etc. but is thwarted every time by Narsimha. Narsimha even kills Bapji's famous wrestlers in Bapji's private court in front of the entire city and showed the whole city that Bapji was afraid for the first time and hence they need not obey Bapji from now on. Bapji was later arrested by police due to his illegal activities after being pressured by the people of the city led by Narsimha and Anita. While being taken by the police, Bapji was humiliated by the people of the city who were fed up with his long tyranny and oppression. However, later he gets released on bail using his money and employing the best lawyers.

Bapji forcibly decides to marry Meenu and locks her up. He finally captures Narsimha and brings him to his palace. There Bapji informs Narsimha that it was him, who planned the communal riot which killed Narsimha's family since riots were necessary to keep the mob afraid and weak and hence aided Bapji in controlling the entire city. He then stabs a fuming Narsimha in his abdomen using his sword and wounds him fatally. Then he orders his men to bury a half-dead Narsimha inside a pillar of his palace and plaster it up. Next morning, when he tries to forcibly wed Meenu, Anita and Ravi arrive with their friends to stop the wedding. However, Bapji releases the prisoners of the jail and hands them weapons to control the mob. When Meenu refuses to marry and instead comes to Ravi, Bapji orders both Meenu and Ravi to be plastered alive in his palace wall while their helpless friends watch being guarded over by armed criminals and prisoners freed by Bapji. Suddenly, a wounded Narsimha breaks the pillar inside which he was plastered up, thus fulfilling his name which is synonymous to the fourth reincarnation or avatar of Lord Vishnu who broke out of the pillar to kill the demon Hiranyakshapu when called by Hiranyakshapu's pious son Prahlad. Similar to Lord Vishnu's 4th avatar, Narsimha breaks out from the pillar and takes on the goons of Bapji while his friends and people also join hands to help Narsimha. He vanquishes the goons with the help of his friends and rescues Meenu and Ravi by breaking the wall in which they were plastered up. Breaking of the pillar and walls by Narsimha disturbs the foundation of the palace and its roof and other walls start crumbling down. Lastly, Bapji gets killed by the arms of the tower clock of his palace which breaks down and falls on him. Ravi and Meenu are together now. Finally, Anita and Narsimha unite and peace returns to the city.

Cast

 Sunny Deol as Narsimha 
 Dimple Kapadia as Anita Rastogi
 Ravi Behl as Ravi Rastogi
 Urmila Matondkar as Meena Singh
 Om Puri as Suraj Narayan Singh "Baapji"
 Johnny Lever as Tempo Dada  
 Satish Shah as Anil Saxena
 Shafi Inamdar as Inspector Vinod Rastogi
 Usha Nadkarni as Mrs. Rastogi 
 Dinesh Hingoo as Tempo Dada Real Poison Seller
 Shail Chaturvedi as Seema's father
 Om Shivpuri as Saxena
 Achyut Potdar as Employee in Saxena Company
 Virendra Saxena as College Principal 
 Subbiraj as Doctor 
 Nivedita Joshi-Saraf as Seema
 Sharat Saxena as Ghasiram
 Mahavir Shah as Jailor Shinde
 Kamaldeep as Thakur
 Guddi Maruti as Telwala wife

Production 
Ayesha Jhulka was initially cast as one of the female lead roles, in what was to have been her debut film, but she was later replaced by Urmila Matondkar.

Music
"Chup Chaap Tu Kyon Khadi Hai" - Alka Yagnik, Mohd Aziz
"Hum Se Tum Dosti Kar Lo" - Alka Yagnik, Udit Narayan
"Jao Tum Chahe Jahan" - Alka Yagnik, Amit Kumar
"Lekin Mohabbat Badi Hai" - Alka Yagnik, Mohd Aziz
"Pakad Pakad Kheench Ke Pakad" - Sudesh Bhosle, Jolly Mukherjee, Kavita Krishnamurthy
"Tum Ho Ajnabi To" - Alka Yagnik, Laxmikant
"Yaad Karoge Wahan" - Alka Yagnik, Amit Kumar

References

External links

1991 films
1990s Hindi-language films
1990s action drama films
Films directed by N. Chandra
Films scored by Laxmikant–Pyarelal
Indian action drama films